Meigan cai, also called mei cai, is a type of dry pickled Chinese mustard of the Hakka people from Huizhou, Guangdong province, China. Meigan cai is also used in the cuisine of Shaoxing, Zhejiang province, China.

The pickle consists of a whole head of various varieties of Chinese mustards and cabbages (芥菜 (leaf mustard), 油菜 (rape), 白菜 (Chinese cabbage) that has undergone an elaborate process consisting of drying, steaming, and salting. The vegetables are harvested, trimmed before the Qingming Festival, and sun-dried until limp. It is then salted or brined, kneaded until the juices are exuded, and left to ferment in large clay urns for 15 to 20 days. The vegetable is then repeatedly steamed and dried until reddish brown in colour and highly fragrant.

This pickled vegetable is used to flavor stewed dishes, in particular Meigan cai cooked with pork, a Hakka classic. In this dish, slices of pork belly are parbroiled and deep-fried before they are steamed with meigan cai.

Meigan cai can also be stuffed into steamed buns called meigan cai baozi. Meigan cai was formerly a tribute item to the imperial palace in the Qing Dynasty.

See also

References

www.meishichina.com/
www.beckyblog.com/
zhidao.baidu.com/

External links

a common type of 芥菜 that is used for meicai
making meicai by drying on a line

Chinese pickles
Hakka cuisine
Plant-based fermented foods
Vegetable dishes
Vegetarian dishes of China